Chusovoy is a town in Perm Krai, Russia, located at the confluence of the Usva and Vilva Rivers with the Chusovaya River,  east of Perm, the administrative center of the krai. Population:

History
It was founded in 1878 during the construction of the Gornozavodsk railway and with the building of the metallurgical plant. In 1933, it was granted town status. After the construction of the bridge over the Chusovaya River in 1964, the town started to develop on the river's left bank.

Administrative and municipal status
Within the framework of administrative divisions, it is, together with three work settlements (Kalino, Lyamino, and Skalny) and seventy rural localities, incorporated as the town of krai significance of Chusovoy (Chusovoy Urban Okrug) —an administrative unit with the status equal to that of the districts. As a municipal division, the town of Chusovoy, together with the work settlement of Lyamino and two rural localities, is incorporated as Chusovskoye Urban Settlement within Chusovskoy Municipal District and serves as the municipal district's administrative center. The remaining two work settlements and sixty-eight rural localities are grouped into seven rural settlements within Chusovskoy Municipal District.

Economy
The main industry of the town is ferrous metallurgy. There are also engineering, metalworking, production of building materials and others. Metallurgical Plant of Chusovoy makes it a company town.

Transportation
Chusovoy is a major transportation hub. Gornozavodsk railway and the railway that runs to Solikamsk connect the town with Perm and other towns in the eastern part of the krai. Kungur–Solikamsk highway runs through Chusovoy. In recent years, it was connected with Perm by a new road through Polazna.

References

Notes

Sources

External links
Official website of Chusovoy 
Chusovoy Business Directory 

Cities and towns in Perm Krai
Chusovoy Urban Okrug
Permsky Uyezd
Monotowns in Russia